Suzy Merchant (born July 26, 1969) most recently served as head basketball coach for the Michigan State University Women's Basketball team.  She is married to Gary Rakan and has two sons, Tyler Rakan and Brady Rakan.

Coaching career

Saginaw Valley State
After inheriting a team with a losing record, Merchant quickly built the SVSU program into a winner, compiling a 54–29 record during her three-year tenure as head coach.  During her first season, the team earned a 15–11 record before going 19–11 in the following year.  The latter achievement earned the team a berth into the NCAA Division II Tournament for the second time in school history.  In her final season, Saginaw Valley State collected a 20–7 record, and was ranked as high as 15th in the nation during the season.

Eastern Michigan
While at EMU, she compiled a record of 147–91 (.618), including three 20-win seasons, three postseason appearances and two Mid-American Conference West Division titles. Merchant's 2003–04 Eastern Michigan team claimed the MAC West Division and MAC Tournament championships for the first time in school history, earning the program's first-ever bid to the NCAA Tournament en route to a 22–8 record. However, Eastern Michigan stumbled in the first round against eventual sweet sixteener Boston College. She followed that impressive season by winning 23 games in 2004–05, the most in school history.  However, a loss in the MAC Tournament semi-final sent EMU to the WNIT where the Eagles fell in the 1st round to eventual semi-finalist Kentucky 79–68.

In 2005–06, the Eagles reached the 20-win plateau for the third consecutive season and won their second MAC West title with a 15–1 conference record, notching the most league wins in school history. Their 22–8 overall record put them into the postseason for the third straight year as the Eagles earned a bid to the WNIT.  EMU's 1st round opponent, Indiana State, defeated the Eagles 79–57. While on maternity leave for most of her final season at EMU, Merchant's Eagles finished second in the MAC West Division with a 10–6 league record and finished 16–13 overall, losing to Kent State 70–56 in the MAC conference semi-finals.

Michigan State
Merchant was named head coach at Michigan State on Monday April 30, 2007.  She replaced Joanne P. McCallie who left Michigan State for the head coaching job at Duke University.  In her second season, Merchant ousted McCallie's #1 seeded Duke Blue Devils in the 2009 NCAA Division I tournament. With her team's Big Ten regular-season co-championship in 2014, Merchant becomes MSU's first women's coach to capture two conference basketball titles.

Head coaching record

 Missed all but four games of 2006–07 while on maternity leave
 Merchant missed 7 games during 2016–17 due to a Medical Leave of Absence

Playing career
Merchant began playing basketball during her career at Traverse City High School. She went on to play four seasons at the guard position for Central Michigan University.  She was a four-year starter and a 3-year captain.

References

External links
Coach Suzy Merchant by Michigan State University

1969 births
Living people
American women's basketball coaches
Basketball coaches from Michigan
Basketball players from Michigan
Central Michigan Chippewas women's basketball players
Eastern Michigan Eagles women's basketball coaches
Michigan State Spartans women's basketball coaches
People from Traverse City, Michigan
Sportspeople from Traverse City, Michigan
Saginaw Valley State Cardinals women's basketball coaches